Juris Laizāns (born 6 January 1979) is a Latvian former professional footballer. A midfielder, he spent a large part of his playing career abroad in Russia. He made 113 appearances for the Latvia national team scoring 15 goals.

Club career
Born in Riga, Laizāns started his career with Skonto FC and moved to the Russian team CSKA Moscow in 2000. His team managed to win the UEFA Cup. After leaving CSKA Laizāns kept playing in Russia for FC Torpedo Moscow, FC Rostov, FC Kuban Krasnodar and FC Shinnik Yaroslavl. In 2009, he came back to Latvia, signing for Olimps/RFS, later also playing for FK Ventspils and participating in the UEFA Europa League group stages. Laizāns signed for Skonto FC at the start of 2010, but left the team soon - he joined the Russian team FC Salyut Belgorod. At the end of the season he was released, and he returned to Skonto FC. Playing 14 matches and scoring two goals, he again left Riga, this time in July 2011 for Fakel Voronezh, playing in the Russian First League. After a season spent in Russia, Laizāns again joined Skonto on 30 August 2012. Laizāns played for Skonto till April 2014, afterwards ending his professional footballer's career.

International career
Laizāns played 113 international matches and scored 15 goals for Latvia. He debuted in 1998 and played at the Euro 2004. His last official international match was a friendly against Republic of Ireland on 15 November 2013. As of 2014, Laizāns ranks third in the list of Latvia's most capped players internationally with 113 appearances. His 15 goals for the national team rank him fifth in the table of top scorers.

Post-playing career
After the end of his professional footballer's career on 11 April 2014, Laizāns accepted an offer from the Russian Premier League club FC Krasnodar to become a member of their scouting staff.

Career statistics
1997 - Skonto Riga (2/0)
1998 - Skonto Riga (26/1)
1999 - Skonto Riga (27/3)
2000 - Skonto Riga (26/6)
2001 - CSKA Moscow (26/0)
2002 - CSKA Moscow (26/3)
2003 - CSKA Moscow (21/1)
2004 - CSKA Moscow (4/0)
2005 - CSKA Moscow (3/1), FC Torpedo Moscow (9/1)
2006 - FC Rostov (21/1)
2007 - FC Kuban Krasnodar (24/4)
2008 - Shinnik Yaroslavl (24/1)
2009 - Olimps/RFS (10/0)
2009 - FK Ventspils (6/1)
2010 - Skonto Riga (12/1)
2010 - FC Salyut Belgorod (13/1)
2011 - Skonto Riga (14/2)
2011/12 - FC Fakel Voronezh (17/3)
2012 - Skonto Riga (6/0)
2013 - Skonto Riga (25/3)
2014 - Skonto Riga (1/0)

Honours
Champion of Latvia - 1998, 1999, 2000
Champion of Russia - 2003, 2005
Russian Cup winner - 2002, 2005
Russian Super Cup winner - 2004
UEFA Cup winner - 2005
 Triobet Baltic League champion - 2011
Baltic Cup winner - 2003, 2008
Latvian Footballer of the Year - 2002

See also
 List of men's footballers with 100 or more international caps

References

External links
 Voetbal International
Latvian Football Federation (in Latvian)
Guardian's Stats Centre

1979 births
Living people
Footballers from Riga
Latvian footballers
Association football midfielders
Latvian expatriate footballers
Latvia international footballers
Skonto FC players
Latvian Higher League players
Russian Premier League players
PFC CSKA Moscow players
UEFA Cup winning players
FC Torpedo Moscow players
FC Rostov players
FC Kuban Krasnodar players
FC Shinnik Yaroslavl players
UEFA Euro 2004 players
FIFA Century Club
Expatriate footballers in Russia
Latvian expatriate sportspeople in Russia
FC Salyut Belgorod players
FC Fakel Voronezh players
JFK Olimps players
FK Ventspils players